Thommanum Makkalum (English: Thomman and Sons) is a 2005 Indian Malayalam-language action comedy film directed by Shafi, written by Benny P. Nayarambalam, and produced by Lal under his production house Lal Creations. The film stars Mammootty, Lal, and Rajan P. Dev in the titular roles.

Shafi remade the film in Tamil cinema as Majaa (2005). and in Kannada as Kaamannana Makkalu with Sudeep.

Plot
The movie revolves around Thomman, who is a thief, and his two sons, Shivan and Sathyan. The story begins when they decide to mend their ways and lead a hardworking life. They own a lorry now and want to find work. Their lorry breaks down near Udumalpet. There the twists start. Sathyan steals some food from Panicker's house. The food is mixed with poison by Panicker due to oppression from the village head Thevar because Panicker's son cheats him and his daughter. Thomman eats the food and is hospitalized. After returning from the hospital, Thomman and his sons approach Panicker to know the truth.  Thomman and his sons decides to help Panicker and they defeat Thevar's gang and take Thevar's henchman Rajakkannu as their slave. Later Thevar's daughter Poonkavanam falls in love with Shivan. Thevar arranges Shivan's marriage with his daughter. Kaliyappan who is Poonkavanam's maternal uncle successfully stops the wedding. At the wedding night Sathyan becomes a thief who robs the groom's ornaments, which makes the brothers to part ways. However, Kaliyappan was the real culprit. He tries to kill Sathyan and tell everyone that he escaped with the money. Panicker's son is killed by Kaliyappan. Shivan comes and helps Sathyan. They go to Thevar's house and reveal to him the truth about Panicker's son and all the misdeeds of Kaliyappan. After all goes well, it was revealed by Rajakkannu that Thomman, due to his son's separation, attempts to commit suicide from a cliff. His sons rushes to the cliffside and Thomman tell that they would fight and defeat him in order to reconsider his decision. at the climax, Shivan and Sathyan beats Thomman and the trio reunite.

Cast
 Mammootty aa Shiva
 Rajan P. Dev as Thomman
 Lal as Sathyan
 Laya as Poonkavanam
 Sindhu Menon as Sheela
 Salim Kumar as Rajakannu
 Janardhanan as Panicker
 Kalasala Babu as Thevar
 Besant Ravi as Thangavelu
 Mohan Jose as Pillai
 Anand as Kaliyappan
 Boban Alummoodan as Gopi Krishnan (Cameo roll)
 Kochu Preman as Doctor Satheeshan
 Abu Salim as Manikyan
 Machan Varghese as Raghu 
 Baiju Ezhupunna as S.I. Thankaraj

Soundtrack 
The film's soundtrack contains 7 songs, all composed by Alex Paul and Lyrics by Kaithapram.

Release
The film was released on 18 March 2005.

Critical Reception
Sify gave it a rating of 3 out of 5.

Box office
The film was commercially successful. and completed 100 days in theatres.

Remakes
Following its success in Malayalam, the film was later remade in Tamil as Majaa, starring Vikram and Asin Thottumkal. It is also remade in Kannada as Kaamannana Makkalu with Sudeep.

References

External links

2000s Malayalam-language films
2005 romantic comedy films
Malayalam films remade in other languages
Films directed by Shafi